"A Boy" (Sonyeoniyeo) is a song recorded by the South Korean singer G-Dragon.  It was released as the fourth and final single from his debut album Heartbreaker.  G-Dragon stated that the song was released as an answer to the plagiarism controversy that surrounded his singles "Heartbreaker" and "Butterfly" when several people were telling him to quit singing, with G-Dragon answering that he "will not quit."

Release
Although the end of G-Dragon's music video for "Breathe" included a teaser the music video for "A Boy", the single was not released as the next single. Instead, G-Dragon released the song "Butterfly". A couple of weeks after the release of "Butterfly", "Soneoniya" was officially confirmed and released as the fourth and final promotional single for the album. G-Dragon stated that the song's lyrics, which were written by himself,  were about the thoughts and struggles he went through as a young boy when he became YG trainee at the age of 13.

Track listing
 "A Boy" – 3:29

Music video

Similar to the music video of "Butterfly", "Sonyeoniya"'s music video is heavily composed of computer graphics.  Unlike that of his previous music videos (which included either a stylized dance or a storyline), the music featured various changing graphics and G-Dragon singing. The Music Video expresses G-Dragon's emotions and his struggles explained in the lyrics of the song.

References

External links
 Official Website

2009 singles
Korean-language songs
G-Dragon songs
2009 songs
YG Entertainment singles
Songs written by G-Dragon